The lake Sigöldulón is a reservoir in Iceland, also known as Krókslón . Situated in the south of the country, not far from Landmannalaugar, it is one of the country's 20 largest lakes at 14 km2.

Both the lake and the nearby power station (Sigölduvirkjun ) take their names from a tuff ridge at about 600 m above sea level where the river Tungnaá once passed through a canyon. Its waters now flow in tubes into the power station, constructed between 1973 and 1977.

See also
List of lakes of Iceland
List of rivers of Iceland

References

Lakes of Iceland